Arthur Eugene Bailey (November 25, 1893 – November 14, 1973) was a backup outfielder in Major League Baseball who played for the Philadelphia Athletics (1917), Boston Braves (1919–1920), Boston Red Sox (1920) and Brooklyn Robins (1923–1924). Bailey batted and threw right-handed. He was born in Pearsall, Texas.

In a five-season career, Bailey was a .246 hitter with two home runs and 52 RBI in 213 games played. His best season was  when he hit .265 with 71 runs, 42 RBI, 109 hits, 11 doubles, seven triples and tallied nine stolen bases in 127 games – all career-highs.

Bailey died in Houston, Texas, at the age of 79.

Head coaching record

External links

Baseball Almanac
Retrosheet

1893 births
1973 deaths
Major League Baseball center fielders
Baseball players from Texas
People from Pearsall, Texas
Philadelphia Athletics players
Boston Braves players
Boston Red Sox players
Brooklyn Robins players
San Antonio Bronchos players
Fort Worth Panthers players
Houston Buffaloes managers
Houston Buffaloes players
Indianapolis Indians players
New Orleans Pelicans (baseball) players
Beaumont Exporters players
Rice Owls baseball coaches
Rochester Red Wings players
Galveston Buccaneers players